Claud is a given name. Notable people with the name include:

Claud Allister (1888–1970), English actor
Claud Beelman (1883–1963), American architect
Claud Irvine Boswell (1742–1824), Scottish judge
Claud Thomas Bourchier (1831–1877), English recipient of the Victoria Cross
Claud E. Cleeton (1907–1997), physicist notable for his work on the microwave spectroscopy of ammonia
Claud Cockburn (1904–1981), radical English journalist controversial for communist sympathies
Claud Derrick, former Major League Baseball shortstop
Claud Lovat Fraser (1890–1921), English Artist, designer and author
Claud Hamilton, 1st Lord Paisley (1543–1621), Scottish politician
Claud Hamilton, 2nd Baron Hamilton of Strabane (1606–1638), the third son of James Hamilton
Claud Hamilton, 4th Earl of Abercorn, PC (1659–1691), Scottish and Irish peer and Jacobite
Claud Heathcote-Drummond-Willoughby (1872–1950), British Conservative Party politician
Alfred Claud Hollis (1874–1961), British Resident to the Sultan of Zanzibar (1923–1929); Governor of Trinidad and Tobago (1930–1936)
Claud Jacob GCB GCSI KCMG (1863–1948), British Army officer who served in the First World War
Claud Ashton Jones (1885–1948), Rear Admiral in the United States Navy and a Medal of Honor recipient
Claud Mintz, American pop musician
Claud Morris (1920–2000), British newspaper owner who sought to make peace between Arabs and Israelis
Claud O'Donnell (1886–1953), Australian rugby union and rugby league player and represented his country at both sports
Claud Phillimore, 4th Baron Phillimore (1911–1994), English architect, 4th Baron Phillimore
Claud Raymond VC (1923–1945), British recipient of the Victoria Cross
Claud Schuster, 1st Baron Schuster (1869–1956), British barrister, Permanent Secretary to the Lord Chancellor's Office
Claud Andrew Montagu Douglas Scott, DSO (1906–1971), Colonel in the Irish Guards
Claud Severn (Chinese Translated Name: 施勳), British colonial administrator
Claud Eustace Teal, fictional character in a series of stories by Leslie Charteris entitled The Saint, starting in 1929
Claud Buchanan Ticehurst (1881–1941), British ornithologist
Claud Thomas Thellusson Wood, Bishop in the mid part of the Twentieth century
Claud Woolley (1886–1962), English cricketer who played for Gloucestershire and Northamptonshire
Lord Claud Hamilton (1787–1808) (1787–1808), British nobleman and politician
Lord Claud Hamilton (1813–1884) PC (1813–1884), British Conservative politician
Lord Claud Hamilton (1843–1925) (1843–1925), British Member of Parliament (MP)
Lord Claud Hamilton (1889–1975), GCVO, CMG, DSO (1889–1975), British soldier and courtier

See also
Claud, Alabama, an unincorporated community in Elmore County, Alabama
Claud Butler, brand of cycle currently produced by Falcon Cycles
Claud Elliott Lake Provincial Park, provincial park in British Columbia, Canada, on northern Vancouver Island
Claud Elliott Creek Ecological Reserve, British Columbia
Claud Jones-class destroyer escort, a class of destroyer escorts built for the US Navy in the late 1950s
GER 'Claud Hamilton' (LNER Class D14/D15/D16), class of 4-4-0 steam locomotive designed by James Holden
Saint-Claud, commune in the Charente department in southwestern France
USS Claud Jones (DE-1033), lead ship of the Claud Jones-class destroyer escorts, launched 27 May 1958
Claude (disambiguation)